Online Gravity is a 2015 non-fiction book written by Paul X. McCarthy, a computational social science researcher. The first edition of the book was published in 2015 by Simon & Schuster.

History
Online Gravity was published in 2015 by Simon & Schuster and written by Paul X. McCarthy, who has served as a professor at the University of New South Wales (UNSW).

Description
The writer of the book uses examples from business to show how a new set of economic laws that are significantly unlike from those in the physical world are in effect today due to the introduction of digital technologies to all aspects of the economy. He claims that one of the primary effects is the way it is changing the structure of business competition, industries, and ultimately the whole economy and creating "gravity giants" - massive dominant global companies who dominate in their space. He asserts that these businesses' evolution is quite similar to the effect of gravity on the formation of our solar system emerging from a dust cloud and with many small fragments of rock into eight clear and distinct planets and notably no dual planets. Although, people cannot avoid the economic effects of technology giants, they can leverage their power for a variety of purposes including helping to rapidly expand small new firms.

Reception
The book has been reviewed by multiple publications, including The Financial Express and The Hindu. Additionally, it was reviewed by a scholarly publication, Journal of Tourism Futures.

A Chinese edition of Online Gravity was published by CITIC Press (Beijing, 2018) and a Russian Edition was published by AST (Moscow, 2019).

References

2015 non-fiction books
Simon & Schuster books
Business books
Economics books
English-language books
Russian-language books
Chinese-language books